Milton Bennion (June 7, 1870 – April 5, 1953) was an American educator and a university and educational administrator.

Biography
Bennion was born in Taylorsville, Utah Territory. He received a B.S. degree from the University of Utah in 1897 and an M.A. degree from Columbia University in 1901.

From 1897 to 1900, Bennion was the president of the Branch Normal School, an institution that eventually developed into Southern Utah University. From 1898 to 1900, he was also a member of the Utah State Board of Education. In 1901, he joined the faculty of the University of Utah and became a full professor of philosophy in 1904. From 1913 to 1941, he was dean of the university's School of Education. Between 1920 and 1926 Bennion was the chairman of the National Council on Character Education for the National Education Association. Bennion was awarded an honorary doctorate degree in education from the University of Utah in 1931. 

Between 1960 and 2013, a building on the Salt Lake City campus of the University of Utah was named in Bennion's honor. In 2006, the Administration Building on the Southern Utah University campus was renamed The Milton and Steven D. Bennion Administration Building, in honor of Bennion and his grandson, who served as president of the school from 1997 until 2006.

Religious beliefs
Bennion was a member of the Church of Jesus Christ of Latter-day Saints (LDS Church), and from 1943 to 1949 he was the sixth general superintendent of the church's Deseret Sunday School Union. His assistants were George R. Hill and A. Hamer Reiser. Bennion succeeded George D. Pyper in this position; Bennion had been Pyper's first assistant in the general Sunday School superintendency since 1934. Bennion was a member of the Sunday School general board for 40 years, beginning in 1909. In 1949, Hill succeeded him as general Sunday School superintendent. Bennion also served as a church missionary to New Zealand from 1889 to 1892.

Personal life
In 1898, Bennion married Cora Lindsay in the Salt Lake Temple.  They had 10 children, including Lowell L. Bennion, a prominent Latter Day Saint scholar and educator. A grandson, Steven D. Bennion, has been president of Ricks College, Snow College, and Southern Utah University.

References

Andrew Jenson, Latter-day Saint Biographical Encyclopedia, vol. 4.

External links
 

1870 births
1953 deaths
People of Utah Territory
American leaders of the Church of Jesus Christ of Latter-day Saints
Heads of universities and colleges in the United States
Columbia University alumni
Counselors in the General Presidency of the Sunday School (LDS Church)
American Mormon missionaries in New Zealand
Southern Utah University faculty
University of Utah alumni
University of Utah faculty
People from Taylorsville, Utah
19th-century Mormon missionaries
General Presidents of the Sunday School (LDS Church)
Latter Day Saints from Utah